Zinc finger protein 33B is a protein that in humans is encoded by the ZNF33B gene.

References

Further reading

External links 
 

Transcription factors